Jaakko Mauri Numminen (22 October 1928 – 19 September 2022) was a Finnish politician. An independent, he served as Minister of Education from May to July 1970.

Numminen died in Helsinki on 19 September 2022, at the age of 93.

References

1928 births
2022 deaths
Finnish politicians
Ministers of Education of Finland
Finnish non-fiction writers
Politicians from Helsinki
People from Vaasa